The Allegheny HYP Club (Harvard-Yale-Princeton Club) is a private social club in downtown Pittsburgh, Pennsylvania. Located at 617-619 William Penn Place, it was built in 1894 and was added to the List of Pittsburgh History and Landmarks Foundation Historic Landmarks in 2002.  On July 1, 1997, the club absorbed the Pittsburgh Club membership and assets.

The Pittsburgh Harvard-Yale-Princeton Club was formally founded on November 7, 1930.  The club merged with the Three Rivers Stadium based Allegheny Club in 2002 after Allegheny had filed for bankruptcy protection.

See also
 List of American gentlemen's clubs
 Duquesne Club
 Economic Club of Pittsburgh
 Greater Pittsburgh Chamber of Commerce

References

External links
Official Site

Cultural infrastructure completed in 1890
Buildings and structures in Pittsburgh
Clubs and societies in the United States
Gentlemen's clubs in the United States
Pittsburgh History & Landmarks Foundation Historic Landmarks